Yugoslavia participated for the first time at the Eurovision Song Contest 1961, held in Cannes, France.

Before Eurovision

Jugovizija 1961 
The first Yugoslav national final to select their entry, was held on 16 February at the Ljubljana Slovene National Theatre Drama in Ljubljana. The host was Milanka Bavcon. There were 9 songs in the final, from the three subnational public broadcasters of Yugoslav Radio Television - JRT;  RTV Ljubljana,  RTV Zagreb and  RTV Belgrade. The winner was chosen by the votes of an eight-member jury of experts, one juror for each of the six republics and the two autonomous provinces . The winning entry was "Neke davne zvezde", performed by Serbian singer Ljiljana Petrović, composed by Jože Privšek and written by Miroslav Antić.

At Eurovision
Ljiljana Petrović performed 5th on the night of the Contest following Finland and preceding Netherlands. At the close of the voting the song had received 9 points, placing 8th equal in a field of 16 competing countries.

Notes

References

External links
Eurodalmatia official ESC club
Eurovision Song Contest National Finals´ Homepage
Eurovision France
ECSSerbia.com

1961
Countries in the Eurovision Song Contest 1961
Eurovision